AITC may refer to:

 All India Trinamool Congress
 Allyl isothiocyanate